The Lieutenant Governor of Mississippi is the second-highest ranking elected executive officer in the U.S. state of Mississippi, below the governor of Mississippi, and is the only official in the state to be a member of two branches of state government. The office of lieutenant governor was established when Mississippi became a state in 1817, abolished for a few decades in the first half of the 19th century, and restored later in the century. The lieutenant governor serves a four-year term with a two consecutive term limit. The current lieutenant governor is Delbert Hosemann, a Republican, who has held the office since 2020.

The lieutenant governor is constitutionally ex officio President of the Mississippi State Senate. As such, they rule on points of order, sign all passed bills, and can cast tie-breaking votes in the body. They are empowered by Senate rules to determine the composition of its committees and refer bills to them. Lieutenant governors have used this power to exert wide influence over the progress of legislation. In the event of a temporary or permanent vacancy in the governorship, the lieutenant governor assumes the higher office's responsibilities as acting governor.

History 
The office of lieutenant governor of Mississippi was established by the state's 1817 constitution and it and the governorship were the only popularly-elected statewide positions at the time, with both serving two-year terms. The first lieutenant governor was Duncan Stewart, who took office on October 7, 1817. The role was eliminated in the 1832 constitution and replaced with a President of the Senate chosen by the body's own members. It was reintroduced in the 1869 constitution and absorbed the responsibilities of presiding over the Senate, with the holder serving a term of four years. During the Reconstruction era in the early 1870s, Alexander Kelso Davis, served as one of the first black lieutenant governors in the country. Evelyn Gandy, who served as lieutenant governor from 1976 to 1980, was the first woman to hold the office in the state and in the Southern United States. Brad Dye, who held the office over three terms from 1980 to 1992, was the state's longest-serving lieutenant governor. Unlike previous holders of the office, he used his appointment power in the Mississippi Senate to strategically place his allies on committees to advance his own political goals.

In January 1986, two state senators sued the lieutenant governor, challenging the legality of his legislative prerogatives on the grounds that they violated the separation of powers language in the state constitution. The case escalated to the Mississippi Supreme Court, which ruled in 1987 that the Senate could award significant legislative powers to the official at its wish. One justice dissented, arguing that the ruling made the lieutenant governor "a powerful legislative creature, a super-senator, vested with sufficient legislative authority to virtually dominate the entire Senate." Following a reduction in the powers of the speaker of the Mississippi House of Representatives that year, a group of senators unsuccessfully attempted to strip the lieutenant governor of their power to appoint committees and refer bills to them. In 1992 the constitution was amended to limit the office holder to serving two consecutive terms. Following the assumption of office of Republican Phil Bryant in 2007, several Democrats in the Senate considered restricting his position's powers, but ultimately did not follow through on their proposals. The incumbent lieutenant governor, Delbert Hosemann, was sworn-in to the office on January 9, 2020.

Election 
Like the seats in the Mississippi State Legislature and the other seven statewide-elected offices, the Mississippi lieutenant governor is popularly elected every four years in the November preceding a United States presidential election year. The lieutenant governor is elected independently of the governor and candidates' qualifications for the former office are the same as for the latter. They serve a four-year term and are limited to serving two consecutive terms in office, with no limits on nonconsecutive terms.

Powers, duties, and structure 

Political scientists often describe Mississippi's lieutenant governor as one of the most powerful such officers in the country. The lieutenant governor is the only official in Mississippi to be a member of two branches of state government, legislative and executive; the Mississippi Supreme Court has ruled this state of affairs an exception to Mississippi's general separation of powers doctrine. They are constitutionally ex officio President of the Senate, while the Senate empowers the lieutenant governor through its rules to determine the composition of its committees and refer bills to them. Historically, the lieutenant governor has determined the composition of all Senate committees except the Rules Committee, of which they are a member. As the Mississippi Senate has no seniority system, lieutenant governors are relatively unrestricted in appointing committees that suit their personal policy preferences. As a result of their powers over committee composition and bill referrals, the official can wield wide authority over the progress of legislation in the Senate.

The constitution empowers the lieutenant governor to participate in legislative debates and to cast tie-breaking votes both in the Senate and in joint resolutions of both houses of the State Legislature. As presiding officer in the Senate, they rule on points of order, sign all passed bills, and are entitled to serve on the Joint Legislative Budget Committee. They are also empowered to appoint two of the members of the Mississippi Board of Education. In the event the incumbent governor of Mississippi dies, is incapacitated, or leaves the state, the lieutenant governor assumes their responsibilities as acting governor. In the event the lieutenant governor is unavailable in the State Senate, the body's president pro tempore assumes their responsibilities there.

The lieutenant governor is constitutionally required to collect the same compensation as the speaker of the House. Their salary is $60,000 per year, but is set to increase to $85,000 annually in 2024. If serving as acting governor, the lieutenant governor collects the same pay as the governor. They maintain an office on the third floor of the Mississippi State Capitol.

Lieutenant Governors and Presidents of the Senate 

 Parties

Lieutenant governors (1817–1832)

Presidents of the Senate (1833–1869)

Lieutenant governors (1870–present)

Notes

References

Works cited

External links 

 
Lists of state lieutenant governors of the United States